Tracy Reed is the name of:

Tracy Reed (English actress) (1942–2012), actress from London
Tracy Reed (American actress) (born 1949), actress from Fort Benning, Georgia
Tracy Reed (writer), internet writer

See also 
 Reed (name)